Nematococcomyces is a genus of fungi within the Rhytismataceae family. It is a monotypic genus, containing the single species Nematococcomyces rhododendri.

References

External links
Index Fungorum

Leotiomycetes
Monotypic Leotiomycetes genera
Taxa named by Franz Oberwinkler